Bettendorf may refer to:

Bettendorf, Germany, a municipality in the district of Rhein-Lahn, Rhineland-Palatinate, Germany
Bettendorf, Iowa, Scott County, Iowa, United States
Bettendorf High School
Bettendorf, Luxembourg, a commune and town in eastern Luxembourg
Bettendorf, Haut-Rhin, a commune in the Haut-Rhin department in France
Bettendorf (surname)